Giorgio Rognoni (26 October 1946 in Modena, Italy on 20 March 1986 in Pistoia from amyotrophic lateral sclerosis) was an Italian professional footballer who played as a midfielder.

Career
Born in Modena, Rognoni began playing football with local side Modena. In 1967, he signed with Milan, where he would make his Serie A debut against Mantova on 11 February 1968. He played for 9 seasons (193 games, 13 goals) in the Serie A for A.C. Milan, U.S. Foggia, A.C. Cesena and A.C. Pistoiese.

Honours
Milan
 Serie A champion: 1967–68.
 European Cup winner: 1968–69.
 UEFA Cup Winners' Cup winner: 1967–68.
 Intercontinental Cup winner: 1969.

References

1946 births
1986 deaths
Neurological disease deaths in Tuscany
Deaths from motor neuron disease
Italian footballers
Serie A players
Modena F.C. players
A.C. Milan players
Calcio Foggia 1920 players
A.C. Cesena players
U.S. Pistoiese 1921 players
Association football midfielders